Mangeshkar is a surname. Notable people with the surname include:

Deenanath Mangeshkar (1900–1942), Marathi theatre actor, a Natya Sangeet musician and a Hindustani classical vocalist
Hridaynath Mangeshkar (1937), Indian music composer
Lata Mangeshkar (1929–2022), Indian playback singer and occasional music composer
Usha Mangeshkar (born 1935), Indian singer

Hindustani-language surnames
Surnames of Hindustani origin